The Las Vegas Aces were a team in the modern American Basketball Association in Las Vegas, Nevada. They were originally based in Orlando, Florida and began play as the Orlando Aces in the Florida Division of the Blue Conference in the 2006-2007 season. They moved to Las Vegas, Nevada on March 14, 2008, after teams in the Blue Conference Florida Division failed to attend scheduled games forcing the Aces to exit the season early.  Renamed the Las Vegas Aces, the team remained in good standing in the ABA.

On July 14, 2009, the Aces announced they were changing their name to the Las Vegas Dynasty.  However, the new name never took and they continued playing as the Las Vegas Aces.  For the 2009-2010 season, they made the playoffs with 3-0 record.

In July 2011, the Aces announced a move to Eatonville, Florida.

References

External links
Las Vegas Aces site
Official ABA site

Sports teams in Las Vegas
Defunct American Basketball Association (2000–present) teams
Basketball teams in Nevada
Basketball teams established in 2006
Basketball teams disestablished in 2011